Sat Sharma (Sat Paul Sharma) is a leader of Bharatiya Janata Party from Jammu and Kashmir. He was a member of the Jammu and Kashmir Legislative Assembly and was president of state unit of the party. He won election from Jammu West Constituency. He also remained as cabinet minister of J&K for Housing and development for 40 days.

References

Living people
Jammu and Kashmir MLAs 2014–2018
Bharatiya Janata Party politicians from Jammu and Kashmir
People from Jammu (city)
Year of birth missing (living people)